Denisonia is a genus of venomous snakes in the family Elapidae. The genus is endemic to Australia, and contains two recognized species.

Species
The following two species are recognized as being valid.

Denisonia devisi  – De Vis's banded snake, De Vis' banded snake, mud adder
Denisonia maculata  – ornamental snake

Etymology
The generic name, Denisonia, is in honor of William Thomas Denison, mid 19th century governor of parts of Australia. The specific name, devisi, is in honor of English herpetologist Charles Walter De Vis.

References

External links
Genus Denisonia Krefft, 1869. Australian Faunal Directory. Australian Government.

Further reading
Krefft G (1869). The Snakes of Australia; An Illustrated and Descriptive Catalogue of All the Known Species. Sydney: Thomas Richards, Government Printer. xxv + 100 pp. + Plates I-XII. (Denisonia, new genus, pp. 82–83 + Plate XI, figure 4).
Waite ER, Longman HA (1920). "Descriptions of Little-known Australian Snakes". Records of the South Australian Museum 1 (3): 173-180 + Plate XXVII. (Denisonia maculata var. devisi, new name, pp. 178–179, Text figure 36 + Plate XXVII, figure 2).
Wilson, Steve (2003). Reptiles of the Southern Brigalow Belt. Australia: World Wildlife Fund. pp. 33–34.

 
Snake genera
Taxa named by Gerard Krefft
Snakes of Australia